Gobonyeone Selefa is a Botswanan footballer who currently plays for Mochudi Centre Chiefs. He has won two caps for the Botswana national football team.

External links

Living people
Botswana footballers
Mochudi Centre Chiefs SC players
Botswana international footballers
Notwane F.C. players
Association footballers not categorized by position
Year of birth missing (living people)